Acryptolaria is a genus of hydrozoans in the family Lafoeidae.

Species
The following species are recognized in the genus Acryptolaria:

 Acryptolaria abies (Allman, 1877)
 Acryptolaria andersoni Totton, 1930
 Acryptolaria angulata (Bale, 1914)
 Acryptolaria arboriformis (Ritchie, 1911)
 Acryptolaria bathyalis Peña Cantero & Vervoort, 2010
 Acryptolaria bulbosa (Stechow, 1932)
 Acryptolaria conferta (Allman, 1877)
 Acryptolaria corniformis Naumov & Stepanjants, 1962
 Acryptolaria crassicaulis (Allman, 1888)
 Acryptolaria disordinata Peña Cantero & Vervoort, 2010
 Acryptolaria elegans (Allman, 1877)
 Acryptolaria encarnae Peña Cantero & Vervoort, 2010
 Acryptolaria flabelloides Peña Cantero & Vervoort, 2010
 Acryptolaria flabellum (Allman, 1888)
 Acryptolaria frigida Peña Cantero, 2014
 Acryptolaria gemini Peña Cantero & Vervoort, 2010
 Acryptolaria gracilis (Allman, 1888)
 Acryptolaria infinita Peña Cantero & Vervoort, 2010
 Acryptolaria intermedia Peña Cantero & Vervoort, 2010
 Acryptolaria inversa Peña Cantero & Vervoort, 2010
 Acryptolaria laertesi Peña Cantero & Vervoort, 2010
 Acryptolaria longitheca (Allman, 1877)
 Acryptolaria medeae Peña Cantero & Vervoort, 2010
 Acryptolaria minima Totton, 1930
 Acryptolaria minuta Watson, 2003
 Acryptolaria niobae Peña Cantero & Vervoort, 2010
 Acryptolaria norfolkensis Peña Cantero & Vervoort, 2010
 Acryptolaria novaecaledoniae Peña Cantero & Vervoort, 2010
 Acryptolaria operculata Stepanjants, 1979
 Acryptolaria profunda Peña Cantero & Vervoort, 2010
 Acryptolaria pseudoangulata Peña Cantero & Vervoort, 2010
 Acryptolaria pseudoundulata Peña Cantero & Vervoort, 2010
 Acryptolaria pulchella (Allman, 1888)
 Acryptolaria pygmaea Peña Cantero & Vervoort, 2010
 Acryptolaria rectangularis (Jarvis, 1922)
 Acryptolaria symmetrica (Nutting, 1906)
 Acryptolaria tetraseriata Peña Cantero & Vervoort, 2010
 Acryptolaria tortugasensis Leloup, 1935
 Acryptolaria undulata Peña Cantero & Vervoort, 2010

References 

 Revision of the genus Acryptolaria Norman, 1875 (Cnidaria, Hydrozoa, Lafoeidae). AL Peña Cantero, AC Marques, AE Migotto, Journal of Natural History, 2007
 Species of Acryptolaria Norman, 1875 (Cnidaria, Hydrozoa, Lafoeidae) collected in the Western Pacific by various French expeditions, with the description of nineteen ... ÁL Peña Cantero, W Vervoort, Zoosystema, 2010

External links 

 
 Acryptolaria at WoRMS

Lafoeidae
Hydrozoan genera